Francis Channing Woodworth (1812 – June 5, 1859) was a printer, vicar and a writer.

He was born at Colchester, Connecticut, the nephew of Samuel Woodworth, and began his career as a printer. After eight years he became a preacher, but quit because of health issues. Thereafter he became a writer of juvenile literature, sometimes using pseudonym Theodore Tinker. He was editor of a magazine called The Youth's Cabinet, which his brother D. Austin Woodworth published. Francis died while sailing to New York from Savannah, Georgia.

Bibliography

 Stories for little folks
 Stories about birds and beasts (1850)
 Stories about the country (1850)
 A wheat-sheaf: gathered from our own fields (1850)
 Our own fields (1850)
 The peddler's boy, or, I'll be somebody (1851)
 A peep at the beasts (1851)
 Stories about birds: with pictures to match (1851)
 Uncle Frank's home stories (1851) 6 volumes
 Youth's book of gems (1851)
 The boy's story book (1852)
 A budget of Willow Lane stories (1852)
 The little mischief-maker: and other stories (1852)
 A peep at the beasts: with twenty engravings (1852)
 The poor organ-grinder: and other stories (1852)
 Uncle Frank's peep at the beasts (1852)
 Uncle Frank's picture gallery (1852)
 The wonderful letter-bag of kit curious: with tinted illustrations (1852)
 First lessons in botany (1853)
 Wonders of the insect world: with illustrative engravings (1853)
 The boy's and girl's country book: with illustrations (1854)
 The boy's story book (1854)
 Buds and blossoms from our own garden (1854)
 Jack Mason: the old sailor (1855)
 The young American's life of Fremont (1856)
 Stories about the country: with illustrations (1857)
 The boy's and girl's country book (1858)
 The picture A.B.C. book with stories (1859)

References

External links
 
 
 

1812 births
1859 deaths
People from Colchester, Connecticut
American people of English descent
Writers from Connecticut